The 1877–78 season was the fifth season of competitive football in Scotland.  This season saw the first playing of the Ayrshire Cup.

Scottish Cup

County honours

Other honours

Scotland national team

References

External links
Scottish Football Historical Archive

 
Seasons in Scottish football